Grahana, Grahanam, or Grahan refers to the Sanskrit term for an eclipse. 

It may also refer to:

 Grahan (TV series), an Indian Hindi crime drama web television series
 Grahan, a 2001 film directed by Shashilal Nair. 
 Grahana, a 1981 Indian Kannada drama film directed by T. S. Nagabharana
 Grahana (novel), a 1972 novel by S. L. Bhyrappa
 Grahanam, a 2004 Telugu film directed by Indraganti Mohan Krishna